The 1921–22 season was the 13th in the history of the Isthmian League, an English football competition.

Wimbledon and Wycombe Wanderers were newly admitted. Ilford were champions for the second season in a row, winning their third Isthmian League title.

League table

References

Isthmian League seasons
I